Bowling has been part of all World Games. The games include the disciplines Nine-pin bowling and Ten-pin bowling.

Nine-pin bowling

Men

Singles

Women

Singles

Mixed

Doubles

Ten-pin bowling

Men

Singles

Doubles

All Events

Women

Singles

In 2017, Laura Buethner of Germany originally won gold in women's singles. In a competition doping test after the medal ceremony, Buethner tested positive for a banned substance. As a result of the positive doping test, Buethner was stripped of the gold medal. Kelly Kulick, who originally won silver, was awarded the gold medal. Clara Guerrero, who originally won bronze, was awarded the silver medal and Daria Kovalova, originally fourth in the final standings, was awarded the bronze medal.

Doubles

All Events

Mixed

Doubles

External links
 World Games ten-pin bowling results from European Bowling Federation
 All World Games Medalists from USBC Congress
 World Games 2009 page at Asian Bowling Federation
 Schere World Games 2005 results from Fédération Luxembourgeoisen des Quilleurs

References

 
Sports at the World Games
World Games